10 Nahi 40 is an India film starring Birbal, Manmauji, J.S. Randhawa, Ramesh Goyal, Rajendra Bhatia, and Manoj Bakshi. 10 Ka Nahi 40 is written and directed by J.S. Randhawa.

Summary 
This educational film aims to send a message to society about the importance of understanding and caring for the elderly. It highlights their insecurities and fears as they approach the twilight of their lives. The story is set in a residential society where both old and young people live together.

Cast 
Birbal as Birbal

Manmauji as Manmauji

J.S. Randhawa as Sumit

Ramesh Goyal

Rajendra Bhatia

Sonal Mudgal

Manoj Bakshi

Sinha Mridul Gupta

Mahesh Gehlot

Radha

Aashi Singh

Ranjan Singh

Ronny Rakhi

Anand Agarwal

Rakhi Anand

Prerna

Rahul Gautam

References

External links 
 10 Nahi 40 at IMDb

2022 films
2020s Hindi-language films
Indian drama films
2022 drama films